Frank Richardson (29 January 1897 – 19 May 1987 ) was an English footballer who played in the Football League for Reading, Plymouth Argyle, Swindon Town, West Ham United and Stoke.

Career
Richardson was born in Barking and played for the local club Barking Town before joining Plymouth Argyle in 1921. In his first season as a professional he scored 31 goals in 41 matches as Plymouth finished in 2nd place in the Third Division South which included a hat-trick on his debut. He signed for First Division Stoke in March 1923 but only scored once as Stoke were relegated at the end of the 1922–23 season. He scored just twice in 1923–24 and was sold to West Ham United where he gain struggled in the top flight and he decided to return to the Third Division South joining Swindon Town.

He soon rekindled his goalscoring ability scoring 15 in 35 appearances in 1924–25 and then an impressive 18 in 19 in 1925–26 which also included 10 in 4 FA Cup matches.

Midway through the season he joined Reading scoring 12 goals in the last 13 matches which saw the "Biscuitmen" win the Third Division South title. In 1926–27 he again had a good season in the cup scoring nine goals in ten, including the only goal in front of Reading's record crowd of 33,042 against Brentford. Reading reached the semi final that year, losing out to Cardiff City. He left Elm Park in the summer of 1930 having scored 55 goals in 103 matches.

Frank then spent 1930–31 at Swindon scoring 11 goals in 39 matches and had a short spell at Mansfield Town before deciding to retire.

When Reading won promotion in 1976, 50 years after Frank achieved the feat in 1926, he was invited to celebrate with the team. Ten years later Reading won Division Three again, and Frank was invited back as the only surviving member of that team.

Career statistics
Source:

Honours
Reading
 Football League Third Division South champions: 1925–26

References

External links
Plymouth Argyle career details
 Plymouth Argyle career details
Swindon Town career details

English footballers
Barking F.C. players
Mansfield Town F.C. players
Reading F.C. players
Plymouth Argyle F.C. players
Swindon Town F.C. players
Stoke City F.C. players
West Ham United F.C. players
English Football League players
1897 births
1987 deaths
Association football forwards